"Goodbye My Lover Goodbye" is a popular song written by Robert Mosely, Leroy Swearingen and Lamar Simington.  The song was first recorded in 1963 by Robert Mosely and released as the B-side of "Crazy 'Bout My Baby" by Capitol Records.

In 1964, the song was recorded by the Searchers, which released the song in Europe under the title "Goodbye My Love ", achieving an international hit. The Searchers version reached number 4 in the United Kingdom, number 7 in Ireland, and number 7 on the Dutch charts. Mosely's recording of the song is included on the soundtrack of the 2018 film Green Book.

Charts

References

1963 songs
1965 singles
The Searchers (band) songs
Songs written by Robert Mosley